Senator Baldwin may refer to:

Members of the United States Senate
Abraham Baldwin (1754–1807), U.S.  Senator from Georgia from 1799 to 1807
Henry P. Baldwin (1814–1892), U.S. Senator from the state of Michigan
Raymond E. Baldwin (1893–1986), U.S. Senator from Connecticut
Roger Sherman Baldwin (1793–1863), U.S. Senator from Connecticut from 1847 to 1851
Tammy Baldwin (born 1962), U.S. Senator from Wisconsin since 2013

United States state senate members
Abraham Dudley Baldwin (1788–1862), Connecticut State Senate
Florence Eugene Baldwin (1825–1886), Minnesota State Senate
Frederick W. Baldwin (Vermont politician) (1848–1923), Vermont State Senate
George Baldwin (Wisconsin politician) (1830–1907), Wisconsin State Senate
Henry Perrine Baldwin (1842–1911), Republic of Hawaii State Senate and Territory of Hawaii State Senate
Howard S. Baldwin (1934–2008), Arizona State Senate
John R. Baldwin (1854–1897), Massachusetts State Senate
John Baldwin (Missouri politician) (1843–1934), Missouri State Senate
Joseph C. Baldwin (1897–1957), New York State Senate
Percival G. Baldwin (1880–1936), Illinois State Senate
Richard J. Baldwin (1853–1944), Pennsylvania State Senate
Stephen Baldwin (politician) (born 1982), West Virginia State Senate
Sumner Baldwin (1833–1903), New York State Senate